The Qarabağ 2009–10 season was Qarabağ's 17th Azerbaijan Premier League season, and their second season under Gurban Gurbanov. They finished the season in 3rd place, and were knocked out of the 2009–10 Azerbaijan Cup at the quarterfinal stage by Khazar Lankaran. They also participated in the 2009–10 UEFA Europa League, entering at the Second Qualifying Round stage. They beat Rosenborg BK of Norway, before beating FC Honka of Finland in the Third Qualifying Round. This meant they faced FC Twente of the Netherlands in the Play-off Round, which they lost 1-3 on aggregate.

Squad

Transfers

Summer

In:

Out:

Winter

In:

Out:

.

Competitions

Azerbaijan Premier League

Results

League table

Azerbaijan Premier League Championship Group

Results

Table

Azerbaijan Cup

UEFA Europa League

Qualifying stage

Squad statistics

Appearances and goals

|-
|colspan="14"|Players who appeared for Qarabağ that left during the season:

|}

Goal scorers

Disciplinary record

References
Qarabağ have played their home games at the Tofiq Bahramov Stadium since 1993 due to the ongoing situation in Quzanlı.
Played in Baku at Tofik Bakhramov Stadium as Karabakh's Guzanli Olympic Stadium did not meet UEFA criteria.
Played in Helsinki at Finnair Stadium as Honka's Tapiolan Urheilupuisto is undergoing renovative work.

External links 
 Qarabağ at Soccerway.com

Qarabağ FK seasons
Qarabag